Reguengo, the name attributed to villages who were royal property in Portugal, may refer to several parishes:

Reguenga, a parish in the municipality of Santo Tirso
Reguengo, a parish in the municipality of Portalegre 
Reguengo do Fetal, a parish in the municipality of Batalha
Reguengo Grande, a parish in the municipality of Lourinhã 
Reguengos de Monsaraz Municipality, a municipality in the district of Évora
Reguengos de Monsaraz (parish), a parish in the municipality of Reguengos de Monsaraz